Jake Roos (born 20 October 1980) is a South African professional golfer.

Roos was born in Pretoria. He was the number one ranked South African amateur golfer before turning professional in 2005 and then joined the Sunshine Tour by finishing 4th at Q-school.

His first victory came at the 2008 Suncoast Classic. His second victory came the following year at the Nedbank Affinity Cup. In 2012, Roos picked up his third victory on Tour at the Platinum Classic after he defeated Chris Swanepoel and Anthony Michael on the fifth hole of a sudden-death playoff. He picked up his second Sunshine Tour victory of the year in June at the Lombard Insurance Classic after defeating Justin Harding in a playoff. Roos entered the final round four shots back of Harding but fired a 63 (−9) to force a playoff. Roos would pick up his third victory of the 2012 season and fifth Sunshine Tour victory overall in November, when he won the Lion of Africa Cape Town Open in a four-man playoff with birdie on the second playoff hole. Roos would pick up his sixth overall Sunshine Tour victory in April 2013 when he won the Golden Pilsener Zimbabwe Open by a single stroke. Roos started the final round four shots back but fired a final round 67 to take the victory.

In March 2014, he won the Barclays Kenya Open and earned a place on the Challenge Tour for the rest of 2014. He would win a second Challenge Tour title at the Aegean Airlines Championship, Germany in July to secure his European Tour card for 2015.

Roos has also won six tournaments on the Golden State Tour, a mini tour in California.

Professional wins (16)

Sunshine Tour wins (6)

Sunshine Tour playoff record (5–5)

Challenge Tour wins (2)

Other wins (8)
2010 Zurich Open
6 wins on the Golden State Tour
2015 Aegean Airlines Pro-am (Greece)

See also
2014 Challenge Tour graduates

References

External links

South African male golfers
Sunshine Tour golfers
European Tour golfers
Sportspeople from Pretoria
White South African people
1980 births
Living people